The 2007 season was the 76th season for Club Social y Deportivo Colo-Colo, a Chilean football club based in Macul, Santiago. In the Primera División Chilena - the top tier of Chilean football - Colo-Colo won the Apertura (first half-season) tournament and came third in the Clausura (second half-season). They were eliminated in the first round of the knock-out stage in the Copa Libertadores and Copa Sudamericana competitions.

Apertura 2007

Squad

Squad changes
In:
  Rainer Wirth Signed from  Universidad Católica
  Gilberto Velázquez Transferred from  Club Guaraní
  Rodrigo Millar Transferred from  Huachipato
  Giovanni Hernandez Comes from  Colón de Santa Fe
  Boris Gonzalez Transferred from  Cobreloa
  Edison Gimenez Transferred from  Club 2 de Mayo
  Gonzalo Jara Transferred from  Huachipato
  Juan Gonzalo Lorca On Loan from  Huachipato

Out:
  Matías Fernández Transferred to  Villarreal CF
  Miguel Caneo Returns to  Godoy Cruz
  Alex Varas Transferred to  Universidad de Concepción
  Andrés González Returns to  América de Cali
  Alvaro Ormeño Transferred to  Gimnasia LP
  Mario Caceres Transferred to  PAS Giannena
  Felipe Flores On Loan to  Club Deportivo O'Higgins
  Cristobal Jorquera On Loan to  Ñublense

Top-scorers
 Humberto Suazo 20 goals
 Giovanni Hernandez 7 goals
 Gonzalo Fierro 6 goals
 Rodrigo Millar 3 goals
 Jose Luis Jerez 3 goals
 Arturo Vidal 2 goals
 Edison Gimenez 2 goals
 Juan Gonzalo Lorca 2 goals
 Moises Villarroel 2 goals
 Ariel Salinas 1 goal
 Arturo Sanhueza 1 goal
 Alexis 1 goal

Table

Results

Results summary

Clausura 2007

Squad

Squad changes
In:
  Cristián Muñoz Transferred from  Huachipato
  Jorge Carrasco Chirino Transferred from  Audax Italiano
  Rodolfo Moya Transferred from  Audax Italiano
  Jose Luis Cabion Transferred from  Deportes Melipilla
  Roberto Cereceda Transferred from  Audax Italiano
  Eduardo Rubio On Loan from  Cruz Azul
  Claudio Bieler Transferred from  Atlético Rafaela
  Gustavo Biscayzacu Transferred from  CF Atlante
  Miguel Aceval Returns from  O'Higgins

Out:
  Humberto Suazo Transferred to  CF Monterrey
  Alexis Returns to  Udinese Calcio
  Arturo Vidal Sold to  Bayer 04
  Sebastian Cejas Back to  Gimnasia LP
  Jose Luis Jerez Transferred to  Panserraikos
  Edison Giménez Transferred to  Olimpia Asunción
  Gilberto Velázquez Transferred to  Olimpia Asunción

Top-soccers
 Gonzalo Fierro 11 goals
 Gustavo Biscayzacu 6 goals
 Giovanni Hernandez 6 goals
 Claudio Bieler 5 goals
 Eduardo Rubio 5 goals
 Rodrigo Millar 4 goals
 Rodolfo Moya 3 goals
 Roberto Cereceda 2 goals
 Miguel Riffo 2 goals
 Miguel Aceval 2 goals
 Jorge Carrasco Chirino 1 goal
 Gonzalo Jara 1 goal
 Boris Sagredo 1 goal
 Arturo Sanhueza 1 goal

Table
Overall table

Group 1

Results

Results summary

Play-offs
Quarter-finals

Semi-finals

Finals

Copa Libertadores

Group stage

Round of 16

Copa Sudamericana

Colo-Colo qualified to the Liguilla Pre-Sudamericana after reaching the Top 4 in the Torneo Apertura.

First stage

Second stage

Round of 16

Friendlies and other matches

References

2007
Chilean football clubs 2007 season
Colo